Idealism is the debut studio album by German electronic music duo Digitalism, released on 9 May 2007 by Virgin Records. In the United States, it was released on 19 June 2007 by Astralwerks. Five of the album's fifteen tracks—"Idealistic", "Zdarlight", "Digitalism in Cairo", "Jupiter Room" and "Pogo"—were previously released as EPs prior to the release. The song "Digitalism in Cairo" samples The Cure's 1979 song "Fire in Cairo". The CD gives access to Opendisc where seven additional tracks can be downloaded.

"Idealistic" was used by Rockstar Games in the announcement trailer for their video game Midnight Club: Los Angeles. It is also used in a commercial for Airness on French TV. "Pogo" is used in a few commercials, including a 2007 Pontiac commercial and a Virgin Mobile commercial, and was featured in Need for Speed: ProStreet and FIFA 08. "Idealistic" is featured in Just Dance 2 and Saints Row: The Third and a sample of it is used by American radio call-in programme Loveline at the beginning of each segment prior to going on air. "Zdarlight" is used in a BMW X1 commercial and a remix of "Zdarlight" was also used in the trailer for Nadeo's TrackMania Nations Forever released in early 2008.

Track listing

Personnel
Credits adapted from Idealism liner notes.

 Jens Moelle – vocals (1, 3–5, 7–9, 11, 12); producer (all tracks); drawings
 İsmail Tüfekçi – producer
 Åbäke – design
 Heiko Prigge – photography

Charts

Release history

References

2007 debut albums
Astralwerks albums
Digitalism (band) albums
Virgin Records albums